Horace Horton Brain (17 November 1885 – 22 March 1966) was an Australian rules footballer who played with St Kilda in the Victorian Football League (VFL).

He later served in World War I, serving mainly in France and suffering mustard gas poisoning in 1917.

Notes

External links 

1885 births
1966 deaths
Australian rules footballers from Tasmania
St Kilda Football Club players
North Hobart Football Club players
Australian military personnel of World War I